Thomastown railway station is located on the Mernda line in Victoria, Australia. It serves the northern Melbourne suburb of Thomastown, and it opened on 23 December 1889.

History

Opening on 23 December 1889, when the railway line was extended from Reservoir to Epping, Thomastown station, like the suburb itself, is named after John and Mary Thomas, who began market gardening near Edgars Creek in 1848.

The station was originally serviced by regional trains on the line to Whittlesea. Electrification and suburban trains were extended along 4.4 kilometres of single track from Reservoir to Thomastown in 1929, paid for by a land developer, who paid for the works and who also guaranteed against operating losses. From 1931, it was the terminus of the railmotor service from Whittlesea, remaining so until electric suburban services were extended to Lalor in November 1959, with services beyond Lalor discontinued and the line closed.

On 7 August 1967, the original station building was destroyed by fire. In 1969, a new station building, which was of a brick construction, was provided.

In 1968, flashing light signals were provided at the Heyington Avenue level crossing, located nearby in the Up direction of the station. In 1980, boom barriers were provided. In the late 1980s, much of the yard to the east of the station was removed.

On 20 December 1996, Thomastown was upgraded to a Premium Station.

In September 2007, a VicRoads park & ride upgrade opened, with an additional 100 car spaces opened to the south-east of the station, taking the total to 382. In 2010, 90 additional car parking spaces were provided.

As part of the duplication of the line from Keon Park to Epping, a second side platform was added, and the existing station rebuilt. On 28 November 2011, the current station opened.

Platforms and services

Thomastown has two side platforms. It is serviced by Metro Trains' Mernda line services.

Platform 1:
  all stations and limited express services to Flinders Street

Platform 2:
  all stations services to Mernda

Transport links

Dysons operates six routes via Thomastown station, under contract to Public Transport Victoria:
 : to Wollert West
 : to Thomastown station (clockwise loop via West Lalor)
 : Pacific Epping – Northland Shopping Centre
 : to Thomastown station (anti-clockwise loop via West Lalor)
 : to Thomastown station (circular route via Darebin Drive)
 : to RMIT University Bundoora Campus

Gallery

References

External links
 
 South Morang extension project gallery
 Melway map

Premium Melbourne railway stations
Railway stations in Melbourne
Railway stations in Australia opened in 1889
Railway stations in the City of Whittlesea